Times Like These may refer to:

Times Like These (Gary Burton album), 1988
Times Like These (Rick Danko album), 2000
Times Like These (Buddy Jewell album), 2005
Times Like These (Friday Hill album), 2006
Times Like These (Austins Bridge album), 2010
"Times Like These" (song), a 2003 single by American alternative rock band Foo Fighters
"Times Like These" (Live Lounge Allstars cover version), a 2020 charity single by Various Artists
"Times Like These", a song by Jack Johnson